Victor Didebulidze (born 4 November 1971 in Tbilisi) is a former Georgian rugby union player. He played as a lock.

Career
Didebulidze first played rugby in Georgia, moving to Tarbes Pyrénées Rugby, in France, for the 1999–2000 season. He later played for Nîmes, Cannes, and Massy.

He had 45 caps for Georgia, from 1991 to 2007, scoring 4 tries, 20 points in aggregate. He played at the 2003 Rugby World Cup, appearing in three games, and at the 2007 Rugby World Cup, also appearing in three games, never scoring. He left the National Team after the competition, where he was one of the oldest players, aged 35.

External links

1971 births
Living people
Rugby union players from Georgia (country)
Rugby union locks
Expatriate rugby union players from Georgia (country)
Expatriate rugby union players in France
Expatriate sportspeople from Georgia (country) in France
Georgia international rugby union players